Gill Industries is an American global supplier that works mainly in welding and assembly, headquartered in Grand Rapids, Michigan with offices in Trenton, Georgia, Richmond, KY, and global offices in Mexico, Europe and Asia. The supplying company works to assemble, develop and supply to clients in the automotive, office and wireless power markets. It was initially named Gill & Williams Tooling as a local tool and die shop when it was created in 1964 by John Gill and Gerald Williams. It expanded into welding and assembly in the 1980s, and has been a supplier for large companies like BMW, Volkswagen, Club Car, Herman Miller and Ford Motors for years. Gill Industries also owns Gill Electronics. Gill Industries is owned by Gill Holding Company, Inc.

Unrelated Companies
An unrelated company with a similar name, Gill Industries Television, operated a cable television system in San Jose, California. The company was acquired in part by Heritage Communications Inc. in late 1985.

References

External links

Manufacturing companies based in Grand Rapids, Michigan
Automotive companies of the United States